Parasilvanus is a genus of beetles in the family Silvanidae, containing the following species:

 Parasilvanus fairmairei Grouvelle
 Parasilvanus mimosae Halstead
 Parasilvanus oblitus Grouvelle
 Parasilvanus ocellatus Grouvelle
 Parasilvanus pulcher Grouvelle
 Parasilvanus tenuis Grouvelle

References

Silvanidae genera